HD 1185 is a double star in the northern constellation of Andromeda. The primary, with an apparent magnitude of 6.15, is a white main-sequence star of spectral type A2VpSi, indicating it has stronger silicon absorption lines than usual, thus making it also an Ap star. The secondary companion, which is 9.08 arcseconds away, is not visible to the naked eye at an apparent magnitude of 9.76. It shares common proper motion and parallax with the primary star but orbital parameters are still unknown.

References

External links
 Image HD 1185
 

A-type main-sequence stars
Ap stars
Double stars
Andromeda (constellation)
Durchmusterung objects
001185
001302
0056